Mahmoud Balarabe is a Nigerian lawyer. He serves as acting Executive Chairman of Kano State Public Complaint and Anti-corruption Commission.

Career
He started his career in private legal practice with R.A Sadiq & Co in November 2001. He was employed by Kano State Ministry of Justice in April 2003 as assistant Director Public Prosecution. In 2006 he was posted to Abubakar Rimi Market as Secretary and Legal Adviser. In 2011 he was posted to Zakka and Hubsi. In 2015 Mahmoud was posted to Public Complaint and Anti Corruption Commission Kano State as a Director of Anti-corruption. He served as Director Public Prosecution before becoming acting Executive Chairman of the Commission in 2021 after the suspension of the Executive Chairman Muhuyi Magaji Rimin Gado.

References

1972 births
Living people
Ahmadu Bello University alumni
People from Kano State
20th-century Nigerian lawyers
21st-century Nigerian lawyers
Nigerian Law School alumni